Cheshmeh Murineh may refer to:

Cheshmeh Murineh, Kermanshah
Cheshmeh Murineh, Lorestan